Kose is a small borough in Võru Parish, Võru County, in southeastern Estonia. It has a population of 615.

References

Boroughs and small boroughs in Estonia